Monopol Hotel in Katowice is a five star historic hotel located in Katowice, Silesian Voivodeship, Poland at Dworcowa Street 5.

History

The hotel was built in 1900 in the eclectic style with elements of Art Nouveau and Gothic Revival architecture on the site of former Cafe Central. It was designed by architect Ludwik Goldstein and officially opened in 1902. It quickly became one of the most representational hotels in the city. Its first owner was Arnold Lustig. The hotel is located opposite the Katowice historic train station and in the 1930s it housed the Orbis travel agency, restaurants, cafes, hairdersser's studio as well as the Kaftal lottery hall. During World War II, the hotel building was taken over and managed by the Germans. After he war, the hotel was the seat of such institutions as PKO Bank Polski and Polish Press Agency. At the beginning of 21st century, the hotel was renovated and in 2007 it acquired the five star status. Today it is part of the Likus Hotele & Restauracje group which belongs to the Likus family of hoteliers who also manage luxury hotels in Kraków, Łódź and Wrocław.

Notable guests
Among the prominent guests of the hotel are Jan Kiepura, Arthur Rubinstein, Josephine Baker, Karol Szymanowski, Eugeniusz Bodo, Marta Eggerth, Deep Purple, Woody Allen, David Beckham and Paris Hilton. In 2012, the England national football team as well as the Portugal national football team stayed at the hotel during the UEFA Euro 2012.

See also
Monopol Hotel, Wrocław
List of hotels in Poland

References

Hotels in Poland
Buildings and structures in Katowice
Hotel buildings completed in 1902